Michelle Bonnard (born 14 September 1980) is an English actress and screenwriter. She attended the Central Junior Television Workshop before studying at LAMDA.

Career 

Michelle Bonnard has worked in television, theatre and film. She first came to prominence playing Helena in the BBC’s 2005 adaptation of A Midsummer Night’s Dream, called ShakespeaRe-Told. Other roles include DCI Goodchild in The Fear for Channel 4 starring Peter Mullan, press officer Tops in BBC/HBO drama Five Days (Golden Globe and BAFTA nominated), Raghad Hussein in Channel 4’s Saddam’s Tribe and Stephanie Blake in Law and Order UK.

Stage appearances include The Quiet House at Park Theatre (Off West End Award nomination for best actress), A Wolf in Snakeskin Shoes at Tricycle Theatre directed by Indhu Rubasingham, Beasts and Beauties at Hampstead Theatre Melly Still, On The Record (Michael Longhurst), Macbeth (Max Stafford-Clark) and Europe (Douglas Rintoul) and The Mirror for Princes (Sulyman Al Bassam) (both at the Barbican Theatre).

Filmography

Film

Television

References

External links 

English television actresses
Living people
1980 births
Alumni of the London Academy of Music and Dramatic Art